Alan Reid (14 December 1926 – 16 October 1988) was an Australian rules footballer who played for the Geelong Football Club in the Victorian Football League (VFL).

Notes

External links 

1926 births
1988 deaths
Australian rules footballers from Victoria (Australia)
Geelong Football Club players